Lagrangian may refer to:

Mathematics
 Lagrangian function, used to solve constrained minimization problems in optimization theory; see Lagrange multiplier
 Lagrangian relaxation, the method of approximating a difficult constrained problem with an easier problem having an enlarged feasible set
 Lagrangian dual problem, the problem of maximizing the value of the Lagrangian function, in terms of the Lagrange-multiplier variable; See Dual problem
 Lagrangian, a functional whose extrema are to be determined in the calculus of variations
 Lagrangian submanifold, a class of submanifolds in symplectic geometry
 Lagrangian system, a pair consisting of a smooth fiber bundle and a Lagrangian density

Physics
 Lagrangian mechanics, a reformulation of classical mechanics
 Lagrangian (field theory), a formalism in classical field theory
 Lagrangian point, a position in an orbital configuration of two large bodies
 Lagrangian coordinates, a way of describing the motions of particles of a solid or fluid in continuum mechanics
 Lagrangian coherent structure, distinguished surfaces of trajectories in a dynamical system

See also
 Joseph-Louis Lagrange (1736–1813), Italian mathematician and astronomer
 Lagrange (disambiguation)
 List of things named after Joseph-Louis Lagrange